The Journal of Ethics & Social Philosophy is a peer-reviewed academic journal of moral, political, and legal philosophy published by the University of Southern California. According to its website, the journal "aspires to be the leading venue for the best new work in the fields that it covers, and applies a correspondingly high editorial standard". It publishes all its articles open-access.

Notable Articles 

The article "Practical Reason, Not As Such" was selected by the Philosophers' Annual as one of the ten best papers published in philosophy in 2018.

Indexing 
The journal is indexed by The Philosophers' Index.

See also 
 List of philosophy journals

References

External links 
 

Ethics journals
Open access journals
Publications established in 2005
English-language journals